Třebihošť is a municipality and village in Trutnov District in the Hradec Králové Region of the Czech Republic. It has about 500 inhabitants.

Administrative parts
Villages of Dolní Dehtov and Horní Dehtov are administrative parts of Třebihošť.

References

External links

Villages in Trutnov District